Marcelo Costa e Castro (born 9 June 1950) is a Brazilian politician who is a congressman in the Brazilian Higher House and former Minister of Heath.

References

1950 births
Living people
Federal University of Rio de Janeiro alumni
Health ministers of Brazil